Chahuk or Chahook may refer to:
 Chahuk, Bushehr
 Chahuk, Kerman
 Chahuk, Razavi Khorasan
 Chahuk, Iranshahr, Sistan and Baluchestan Province
 Chahuk-e Mehrab, Iranshahr County, Sistan and Baluchestan Province
 Chahuk, Khash, Sistan and Baluchestan Province
 Chahuk, Yazd